Development Southern Africa, the journal of the Development Bank of Southern Africa, publishes articles that reflect innovative thinking on key development challenges and policy issues facing South Africa and other southern African countries.

African studies journals
Taylor & Francis academic journals
Development studies journals
5 times per year journals